The Alento is a river in southwestern Italy. Originating from Le Corne mountain, nearby the village of Gorga, it flows in the Campanian territory of Cilento, in the Province of Salerno. Its mouth is on the  Tyrrhenian Sea, close to the Ancient Greek town of Velia, at the borders between the municipalities of Casal Velino and Ascea.

History
Originally named Alentum, the Latin word Cis Alentum (i.e.: "On this side of the Alento") is the origin of the toponym "Cilento". The river was mentioned by Strabo, into the Geographica, and by Cicero, who defined it noble.

Geography
After its origin in Gorga (a frazione of Stio), the river flows in a large valley crossing the municipal territories of Magliano Vetere and Monteforte Cilento. After it, between the territories of Cicerale, Prignano Cilento and Perito (at Ostigliano) the river forms a reservoir serving a dam. After the dam and a nature park it crosses the municipalities of Rutino, Lustra, Omignano (at Omignano Scalo), Salento, Castelnuovo Cilento (through the villages of Vallo Scalo and Velina), Casal Velino and Ascea. The mouth is located between Marina di Casalvelino and Velia.

The Alento has 3 tributaries: Palistro river and Badolato creek originate from the Mount Gelbison, Fiumicello creek originates from the Mount Stella.

Natural environment
The river, partly included in the territory of the Cilento National Park, counts a nature park named Oasi Fiume Alento ("Alento River Oasis") nearby the dam. Due to the integrity of its natural environment, the river is home to some rare species of animals, as the European otter (Lutra lutra, rare in Italy) and the Italian bleak (Alburnus albidus).

References

External links

Rivers of the Province of Salerno
Cilento
Rivers of Italy
Drainage basins of the Tyrrhenian Sea